Gjøvik Fotballklubb was a Norwegian women's football club from Gjøvik. It founded on August 15, 1991, it played in the First Division, the second tier in Norway.

The club was a merger between the women's football sections of Vind and Raufoss. Originally named Raufoss/Vind FK, in 1996 the club changed its name to Gjøvik FK. After the 2009 season, however, the club had run out of funds and faced hardships in acquiring training space. The team subsequently relocated to Raufoss.

Their most famous player was cross-country skier Ingvild Flugstad Østberg.

See also
Gjøvik FF

References

External link
Official site

Sport in Gjøvik
Defunct women's football clubs in Norway
Association football clubs established in 1991
1991 establishments in Norway
Association football clubs disestablished in 2009
2009 disestablishments in Norway